This article lists occurrences of the paradoxical infinite "sum" +1 -1 +1 -1 ... , sometimes called Grandi's series.

Parables

Guido Grandi illustrated the series with a parable involving two brothers who share a gem.

Thomson's lamp is a supertask in which a hypothetical lamp is turned on and off infinitely many times in a finite time span. One can think of turning the lamp on as adding 1 to its state, and turning it off as subtracting 1. Instead of asking the sum of the series, one asks the final state of the lamp.

One of the best-known classic parables to which infinite series have been applied, Achilles and the tortoise, can also be adapted to the case of Grandi's series.

Numerical series
The Cauchy product of Grandi's series with itself is 1 − 2 + 3 − 4 + · · ·.

Several series resulting from the introduction of zeros into Grandi's series have interesting properties; for these see Summation of Grandi's series#Dilution.

Grandi's series is just one example of a divergent geometric series.

The rearranged series 1 − 1 − 1 + 1 + 1 − 1 − 1 + · · · occurs in Euler's 1775 treatment of the pentagonal number theorem as the value of the Euler function at q = 1.

Power series
The power series most famously associated with Grandi's series is its ordinary generating function,

Fourier series

Hyperbolic sine
In his 1822 Théorie Analytique de la Chaleur, Joseph Fourier obtains what is currently called a Fourier sine series for a scaled version of the hyperbolic sine function,

He finds that the general coefficient of sin nx in the series is

For n > 1 the above series converges, while the coefficient of sin x appears as 1 − 1 + 1 − 1 + · · · and so is expected to be 1⁄2. In fact, this is correct, as can be demonstrated by directly calculating the Fourier coefficient from an integral:

Dirac comb
Grandi's series occurs more directly in another important series,

At x = , the series reduces to −1 + 1 − 1 + 1 − · · · and so one might expect it to meaningfully equal −1⁄2. In fact, Euler held that this series obeyed the formal relation Σ cos kx = −1⁄2, while d'Alembert rejected the relation, and Lagrange wondered if it could be defended by an extension of the geometric series similar to Euler's reasoning with Grandi's numerical series.

Euler's claim suggests that

for all x. This series is divergent everywhere, while its Cesàro sum is indeed 0 for almost all x. However, the series diverges to infinity at x = 2n in a significant way: it is the Fourier series of a Dirac comb. The ordinary, Cesàro, and Abel sums of this series involve limits of the Dirichlet, Fejér, and Poisson kernels, respectively.

Dirichlet series

Multiplying the terms of Grandi's series by 1/nz yields the Dirichlet series 

which converges only for complex numbers z with a positive real part. Grandi's series is recovered by letting z = 0.

Unlike the geometric series, the Dirichlet series for η is not useful for determining what 1 − 1 + 1 − 1 + · · · "should" be. Even on the right half-plane, η(z) is not given by any elementary expression, and there is no immediate evidence of its limit as z approaches 0. On the other hand, if one uses stronger methods of summability, then the Dirichlet series for η defines a function on the whole complex plane — the Dirichlet eta function — and moreover, this function is analytic. For z with real part > −1 it suffices to use Cesàro summation, and so η(0) = 1⁄2 after all.

The function η is related to a more famous Dirichlet series and function:

 

where ζ is the Riemann zeta function. Keeping Grandi's series in mind, this relation explains why ζ(0) = −1⁄2; see also 1 + 1 + 1 + 1 + · · ·. The relation also implies a much more important result.

Euler characteristics
Given a CW complex S containing one vertex, one edge, one face, and generally exactly one cell of every dimension, Euler's formula  for the Euler characteristic of S returns . There are a few motivations for defining a generalized Euler characteristic for such a space that turns out to be 1/2.

One approach comes from combinatorial geometry. The open interval (0, 1) has an Euler characteristic of −1, so its power set 2(0, 1) should have an Euler characteristic of 2−1 = 1/2. The appropriate power set to take is the "small power set" of finite subsets of the interval, which consists of the union of a point (the empty set), an open interval (the set of singletons), an open triangle, and so on. Generally, he finds χ(2A) = 2χ(A) for any polyhedral set A, and the base of the exponent generalizes to other sets as well.

This space can be described as the quotient of the infinite-dimensional sphere by identifying each pair of antipodal points. Since the infinite-dimensional sphere is contractible, its Euler characteristic is 1, and its 2-to-1 quotient should have an Euler characteristic of 1/2.

This description of RP∞ also makes it the classifying space of Z2, the cyclic group of order 2. Tom Leinster gives a definition of the Euler characteristic of any category which bypasses the classifying space and reduces to 1/|G| for any group when viewed as a one-object category. In this sense the Euler characteristic of Z2 is itself 1⁄2.

In physics 
Grandi's series, and generalizations thereof, occur frequently in many branches of physics; most typically in the discussions of quantized fermion fields (for example, the chiral bag model), which have both positive and negative eigenvalues; although similar series occur also for bosons, such as in the Casimir effect.

The general series is discussed in greater detail in the article on spectral asymmetry, whereas methods used to sum it are discussed in the articles on regularization and, in particular, the zeta function regulator.

In art
The Grandi series has been applied to e.g. ballet by Benjamin Jarvis, in The Invariant journal. PDF here: https://invariants.org.uk/assets/TheInvariant_HT2016.pdf The noise artist Jliat has a 2000 musical single Still Life #7: The Grandi Series advertised as "conceptual art"; it consists of nearly an hour of silence.

Notes

References

Grandi's series, Occurrences of
Grandi's series